Ronald James Crisp (born 24 September 1938) is an English former footballer who was adept in a variety of positions. He played in England, the United States and South Africa.

Club career

Early years 
Crisp began his career as an amateur at Isthmian League club Dulwich Hamlet and secured a move to the Football League with Luton Town in November 1959. He departed in 1960, having failed to make an appearance.

Watford 
Crisp signed for Third Division club Watford in July 1960. Operating initially as a forward, he had a slow start to his career at Vicarage Road, making just seven appearances and scoring one goal during the 1960–61 season and deputising for Cliff Holton. Crisp broke into the team in the following campaign and was top scorer with 13 goals in all competitions. He scored a memorable goal in a match against Port Vale in February 1962, scoring within 30 seconds of the kickoff after running from the centre circle into the penalty area. Crisp fell out of the team again during the 1962–63 season, but was given a chance at wing half by incoming manager Bill McGarry in the following campaign, making 26 league appearances. Crisp departed Watford in 1965, having made 102 appearances and scored 17 goals during his time with the Hornets.

Brentford 

Crisp signed for Third Division club Brentford in August 1965 for a £2,000 fee. He failed to break into the team, making just 22 appearances and scoring one goal before departing in December 1966. He spent much of his time with the reserve team, winning the 1966–67 London Challenge Cup with the team.

United States 
Crisp moved to the United States in 1967 to sign for National Professional Soccer League club Los Angeles Toros. Despite a bottom place finish for the Toros in the Western Division, Crisp had a successful 1967 season, making 17 appearances, scoring one goal and was named the league's Player of the Year. The franchise relocated to San Diego the following year and transferred to the new North American Soccer League. Crisp was once again a standout player, making 32 appearances, scoring five goals and helping the club to the Pacific Division title. The team went all the way to the NASL Final, but were beaten 3–0 on aggregate by Atlanta Chiefs. Crisp was named in the 1968 All-Star team.

Return to England 
Crisp returned to England in March 1969 to go on trial at Third Division club Orient. He signed a contract, but bought himself out of it and departed the club without making an appearance.

South Africa 
Crisp moved to South Africa in 1969 to join National Football League club Durban Spurs. He had a good first season, winning the league title. Crisp moved to Bloemfontein City in 1970, but transferred mid-season to Durban Spurs United, with whom he remained until 1971. Crisp had spells with East London United and Port Elizabeth City in 1972 and 1974 respectively.

Coaching career 
After winding down his playing career in South Africa, Crisp served as coach of Glenwood, Juventus (two spells) and Expro 81.

Representative career 
While with Watford, Crisp played for the Hertfordshire representative team.

Personal life 
Crisp lives in South Africa and is a sales executive for an office machine company in Durban. He has been married twice and has two sons and one daughter.

Honours 
Brentford
 London Challenge Cup: 1966–67
Durban Spurs
 National Football League: 1969

Individual

 National Professional Soccer League Player of the Year: 1967
 North American Soccer League All-Star Team: 1968

Career statistics

References 

1938 births
Living people
People from Datchet
English footballers
Dulwich Hamlet F.C. players
Luton Town F.C. players
Watford F.C. players
Brentford F.C. players
Leyton Orient F.C. players
English Football League players
San Diego Toros players
Los Angeles Toros players
North American Soccer League (1968–1984) players
National Professional Soccer League (1967) players
National Football League (South Africa) players
Addington F.C. players
Durban United F.C. players
East London United F.C. players
English expatriate footballers
English expatriate sportspeople in the United States
English expatriate sportspeople in South Africa
Expatriate soccer players in the United States
Expatriate soccer players in South Africa
Association football utility players